Yu Fengkai (born 13 March 1995) is a Chinese boxer. He competed in the men's heavyweight event at the 2016 Summer Olympics.

References

External links
 

1995 births
Living people
Chinese male boxers
Olympic boxers of China
Boxers at the 2016 Summer Olympics
Place of birth missing (living people)
Sportspeople from Zibo
Heavyweight boxers